The bombardment of Algiers in 1682 was a naval operation by France against the Regency of Algiers during the French-Algerian War of 1681–88. Louis XIV sent Duquesne to bombard Algiers after the Dey declared war on France in 1681. Duquesne sailed from Toulon with a fleet of around forty vessels and reached Algiers in July 1682 after many delays caused by poor weather. Bombarded several times in August, the city suffered extensive damage.  The peace which the Dey was eventually forced to seek was however never agreed, as renewed bad weather forced Duquesne to retreat to French waters.

Background
In October 1680, barbary pirates captured a number of French vessels, without declaration of war, and took the captains and crews to Algiers as slaves. On 18 October the Dey of Algiers, Baba-Hassan, officially declared war on Louis XIV and on 23 October, he announced the commencement to hostilities to the French consul, Jean Le Vacher. At the same time, he also ordered twelve warships to sea.  Learning of this, Louis XIV ordered his ministers to prepare a punitive expedition.

Command was given to Duquesne, with the comte de Tourville as his co-commander, and, as rear admirals, the  chevalier de Lhéry and the marquis d'Amfreville. The fleet comprised eleven ships of the line, fifteen galleys commanded by the chevalier de Noailles, five bomb galiots, two fireships and various small vessels. The galiots were a new invention, eagerly promoted by Colbert, which would see their first action off Algiers.

French naval forces
Duquesne left Toulon on 12 July at the head of eleven warships and five galiots.

On 18 July, after an easy crossing, Duquesne anchored at Ibiza where he met up with fifteen galleys commanded by the duc de Mortemart (1679-1688).

Attack on Algiers
The fleet reached Algiers on 22 July 1682. Duquesne's orders were to bombard Algiers into complete submission. Preparing his attack, he sent a detachment of ships commanded by M. de la Maurinière to set fire to two Turkish ships in the port of Cherchell. He then arranged his vessels so as to be ready to attack Algiers, using his galleys to tow his ships of the line and galiots into position.

However the weather was so bad that the first half of August without him being able to order the attack.  On 15 August, he sent his galleys back to Marseille as their crews could bear the terrible conditions no longer.  This made it difficult for his galiots to manoeuvre. To let them approach and retire from the city in safety, he had longboats commanded by Job Forant carry five anchors close in to the north east of the city, with 2,000 fathoms of cable connecting them to the galiots.

On 16 August the longboats dropped their anchors near the mole and the galiots were hauled along the cables into position. However it was only on the night of the 20 August that the French were ready to begin their bombardment. The first assault was largely ineffective as the galiots were too far away from their targets, Nicolas Camelin and Pierre Landouillette de Logivière having misjudged the distance.

The French decided that it would be better to anchor off the northwest of the city, and on the order of the chevalier de Tourville, Belle-Isle-Erard anchored two ships in position on the night of 20–21 August, and le chevalier de Lhéry brought up three others the next night, much closer in than the ships of Belle-Isle-Erard. Landouillette, captain of the bomb galiots, fired the mortars on board La Cruelle himself. The bombs barely reached the mole and did not touch the city. On  26 August they adjusted their positions again and after this kept up an intense and well-targeted bombardment until 5 September, inflicting serious damage on the port and the city.

The second night of the bombardment was 30 August. The galiots hauled themselves into position along their cables and fired from much closer to the mole. Tourville, whom Duquesne had placed in command of the second attack, adjusted the ships’ distances again and brought the La Cruelle in before the lighthouse of Algiers. on the third night of bombardment, on the night of the 3 and 4 September, the galiots were closer in still, near the mole. The next night, Duquesne sent the galiots in closer still, 200-260 toises (400–520 metres) from the mole, and around 800 metres from the city wall.  That night, they repelled an attack on the galiots by an Algerian galley, three brigantines and a number of smaller boats. On 4 September, the Dey sent Jean Le Vacher to Duquesne to sue for peace. Duquesne indicated to Le Vacher that if the Algerian authorities had proposals for peas e to make, they should present them themselves, and that he still had four thousand bombs to fire on them if their proposals were not satisfactory.

On 13 September, the corsair captains managed to manoeuvre their ships so as to threaten the French position. Shortly afterwards, with bad weather making it impossible for the French to hold their positions, they were obliged to abandon the bombardment and retire to France.

Aftermath
The outcome of the operation is difficult to assess. Around 500 Algerians were killed, and fifty buildings demolished. The French fleet succeeded in inflicting serious damage on the port and city of Algiers, without suffering any major losses itself, and it had forced the Dey to sue for peace. However Duquesne's mission had been to secure Dey's complete submission, which time and the weather had not permitted. When Louis XIV learned on 11 October that the mission had not achieved its aim, he made his displeasure clear. He nevertheless realised the overwhelming effect that relatively few bombs - some 280 - had had on the city.  During the French bombardments which followed, in 1683, 1684 and 1688, Duquesne and then Tourville, would force the Dey to free all the Christians he held in slavery, but they did not succeed in corsair war waged by the Regency of Algiers against European merchant vessels in the Mediterranean.

The Jews of Marseilles were suspected of passing warnings to their co-religionists in Algiers about the impending French assault, and this led to their being temporarily expelled from the city.

The next year, Duquesne sailed again to bombard Algiers for the second time (see Bombardment of Algiers (1683)).

References

Algiers 1682
Louis XIV
Barbary pirates
Navy of the Ancien Régime
Conflicts in 1682
History of Algiers